Ainthu Ainthu Ainthu (stylized as 555) is a 2013 Indian Tamil-language action thriller film directed by Sasi. It stars Bharath and Chandini Sreedharan in the main lead roles. Erica Fernandes and Santhanam play pivotal supporting roles. The film revolves around psychology and mind games, had been in production since 2008.  The film released on 10 August 2013. It was considered a comeback commercial hit for Bharath.

Plot
Aravind (Bharath) had met with a terrible accident seven months ago that left him physically and emotionally scared. He is currently living with his elder brother Gopal (Santhanam) and is being treated for some psychotic disorder.

Aravind claims that during the accident, his girl friend Liyana (Chandini Sreedharan) was with him, and she died. The strange thing is that such a girl does not seem to exist at all. No one has seen or even heard of her; she does not appear in the student list in her college or even the census reports. She is not mentioned in the newspaper reports of the accident either, and some strangers are occupying her home. The psychiatrist is of the opinion that Liyana is a figment of Aravind's imagination and exists only in his mind.

Unable to convince even Gopal of her existence, Aravind tries to get on with his life by going back to work. Here he meets Manjari (Erica Fernandes), a colleague in a software company called Paayal Infotech which is owned by CEO Chitranjan (Sudesh Berry). Manjari sympathises with Aravind and tries to help find some clue to Liyana's identity. Despite all evidence against Liyana's existence, memories of her and their love continue to haunt Aravind. Fortunately for him, a chance meeting with Liyana's aunt (Lakshmi) sets the ball rolling (Aravind obtains all the information from Liyana's aunty, who is not really her aunty but instead pretended to be, she gets killed by a goon who is killed by Aravind in a few seconds).

After that, things begin to unravel. Aravind finds out that he is being tortured by Chitranjan. The reason for doing this is that Liyana happens to be a splitting image of Chitranjan's own dead lover called Payal, so in order to marry her, Chitranjan made a plan to torture Aravind by involving Manjari in this game, and Gopal gets killed in this mayhem. Aravind shoots Manjari and the henchmen. Chitranjan narrates that the doctor (T. V. Rathnavelu) was a fake person set up by him to fool Aravind and also threatened Gopal to pretend ignorance about Liyana. The doctor tortures Aravind with a planned shock treatment to make him go insane, but he is completely healthy.

Aravind then kills both the doctor and Chitranjan and unites with Liyana, who is alive.

Cast
 Bharath as Aravind
 Mrithika as Liyana "Liya" George and Paayal (Dual Role)
 Erica Fernandes as Manjari
 Santhanam as Gopal
 Sudesh Berry as Chitranjan
 Manobala as Yoga Instructor
 Raj Bharath as Nikhil
 Swaminathan as G.R
 Lakshmi as Liyana's aunt
 T. V. Rathnavelu as Doctor
 John Vijay as Special appearance
 Sathish Krishnan as Special appearance

Production
After the moderate success of his romantic film, Poo, Sasi began work on his next, an action entertainer, in late 2008 and worked on the script of the film for almost two years. Bharath was signed on to play the lead role in mid-2010 and in interviews since signing the project, he has expressed how important the film will be to his career. The shoot of the film began in June 2011. Bharath bulked up for his role, sporting six-pack for the film, which he has been maintaining ever since.

Soundtrack

The film score and soundtrack of Ainthu Ainthu Ainthu are composed by Simon, making his debut as a film composer through this film. "Elavu", a single track from the album, was released on 5 April by actor Arya. The song "Elavu" marks the first time ever featuring an oppari genre in hip hop, where it was critically acclaimed and greatly received. The audio was released by the director Shankar and was received by actor  Dhanush. The launch of the film's album was held on 15 April 2013.

Release
555 was originally scheduled to release on 15 August 2013, coinciding with Independence day, but was brought forward to 10 August.  It was later dubbed in Hindi as Paanch Ka Punch.

Reception
Behindwoods said, "Sasi is a master teller when it comes to narrating a story about love and its finer aspects, and there would always be a kind of poignancy in them. 555 is no exception. In Arvind Sureshkumar's story, Sasi has also used a lot of action and suspense to drive home his point. There are adequate twists and turns in the narration to make the audience engrossed in the enterprise."

A review from Sify gave 4 stars out of 5 and said, "Director Sasi, who has made few realistic films in the past, has made a hardcore action entertainer with romance and suspense, a new genre for him. Though his intentions are noble and Bharath has put in a lot of effort, the film is far from being watchable and fails to impress."

Prashanth Reddy of Desimartini said, "A few minutes into the film, I smugly told myself how I expected it to end; my predictions couldn't have been more wrong. That's the one thing about Ainthu Ainthu Ainthu that I love: it always kept me puzzled about the happenings and continuously piled mounds of absurd as it moved forward." and added, "The kind of epic back story and sentimentality it lends its antagonist is sheer rip-roaring awesomeness. The non-linear screenplay is a huge plus in making the film interesting."

Indiaglitz.com said, "Bharath has put his heart and soul in this movie, making it worth the wait. His transformation from an urban cool dude to a steel gritted toned angry hunk is amazing, even though the justification for his clenched body is never shown in a convincing manner. That said, this might be the movie that could bring back him to the limelight again. The rest of the cast are adequate enough to fill their roles neatly."

M Suganth of The Times of India gave 3/5 and said, "Sasi, who has so far made soft films like Sollamale and Poo, tries his hand at a commercial thriller with action, suspense, and of course, the inevitable romance. While the director's intent in giving us a fresh and different commercial film is evident, sadly, he doesn't manage to sidestep the genre's pitfalls."

S Saraswathi of Rediff said Ainthu Ainthu Ainthu is a romantic thriller that has all the necessary twists and turns which will definitely entertain the audience.

References

External links
 

2013 films
2013 action thriller films
2010s Tamil-language films
Indian action thriller films
Tamil-language psychological thriller films
2013 psychological thriller films
Films directed by Sasi (director)